Erik Leue (born August 9, 1985) is a German sprint canoer who has competed since 2007. He won two medals at the ICF Canoe Sprint World Championships with a gold (C-2 1000 m: 2009) and a silver (C-4 1000 m: 2007).

References
Canoe09.ca profile 

1985 births
German male canoeists
Living people
ICF Canoe Sprint World Championships medalists in Canadian